When the Young Wine Blossoms is a 1927 German silent comedy film directed by Carl Wilhelm and starring Robert Scholz, Egon von Jordan and Lotte Lorring. It was based on a play by the Norwegian writer Bjørnstjerne Bjørnson. It was subsequently remade as a sound film of the same title in 1943.

The film's sets were designed by the art director Artur Günther.

Cast
 Robert Scholz as Mirko Graf Petrowitsch
 Egon von Jordan as Graf Tino
 Lotte Lorring as Komtesse Milena
 Olga Engl as Milenas Tante
 Sig Arno as Dr. Krolenko, Advokat
 Hanni Weisse as Natascha Kaminskaja, Tänzerin
 Lissy Arna
 Oreste Bilancia as Sekretär Jan Krawatschky
 Adolphe Engers as Toto von Giri
 Carl Geppert as Justizminister Marko Danulesku

References

Bibliography
 Grange, William. Cultural Chronicle of the Weimar Republic. Scarecrow Press, 2008.

External links

1927 films
1927 comedy films
Films of the Weimar Republic
German silent feature films
German comedy films
Films directed by Carl Wilhelm
German black-and-white films
Silent comedy films
1920s German films